The 2013 UAFA Club Cup Final was a football match which was played on 24 April and 14 May 2013. It was the 1st final of the UAFA Club Cup and the 26th of the Arab World's inter-club football tournament. The final was played as home and away matches, and it was contested between Al-Arabi SC of Kuwait and USM Alger of Algeria.

Qualified teams

Venues

Sabah Al-Salem Stadium
Sabah al-Salem Stadium is a multi-purpose stadium in Kuwait City, Kuwait. It is currently used mostly for football matches and is the home stadium of Al Arabi Kuwait. The stadium holds 15,000 people and hosted many matches of the 1980 AFC Asian Cup, including the final.

Stade 5 Juillet 1962
The 5 July 1962 Stadium, (the name refers to 5 July 1962, the day Algeria declared independence), is a football and athletics stadium located in Algiers, Algeria. The stadium was inaugurated in 1972 with a capacity of 95,000. It served as the main stadium of the 1975 Mediterranean Games, the 1978 All-Africa Games, the 2004 Pan Arab Games, and the 2007 All-Africa Games. The stadium was one of two venues of the 1990 African Cup of Nations (the other venue was the 19 May 1956 Stadium in Annaba). It hosted 9 matches of the tournament, including the final match, which had a second record attendance of 105,302 spectators. In the final match, the home team Algeria defeated Nigeria 1–0 to win the tournament. The record attendance is of 110,000 spectators in the friendly match between Algeria and Serbia on 3 March 2010. It also hosted the 2000 African Championships in Athletics. After a formal compliance with current safety standards in 1999, the stadium was reduced to an 80,200 capacity, and following a new phase of renovation in 2003.

Road to final

Note: In all results below, the score of the finalist is given first (H: home; A: away).

Format
The final was played on a home-and-away two-legged basis, with the order of legs decided by a draw, held after the group stage draw. If the aggregate score was tied after the second leg, the away goals rule would be applied, and if still level, the penalty shoot-out would be used to determine the winner (no extra time would be played).

Matches

First leg

Second leg

The second leg meeting took place at Stade 5 Juillet 1962 in Algiers, in the presence of more than 50,000 supporters, as well as a number of Algerian state officials led by Prime Minister at that time Abdelmalek Sellal. The match was officiated by Saudi international referee Khalil Jalal, The match witnessed the absence of USM Alger defender Nacereddine Khoualed due to suspension. First half in the first quarter there was equal performance with an advantage for USM Alger who opened the scoring in the 13th minute through Noureddine Daham after a pass from Bouazza Feham. In the 25th minute Al-Arabi scored a goal through Mohamed Farih which was canceled due to offside, although the replay shows that there was no offside. In the 33rd minute, after a counterattack and the exit of Daham in front of goalkeeper Sulaiman Abdulghafour and after a shot hit him and while heading to the empty goal it hit the crossbar. USM Alger and after a distribution from Mokhtar Benmoussa, Lamouri Djediat managed to add the second goal in the 37th minute. Three minutes before the end of the first half Hamza Koudri was sent off after a dangerous intervention on Al-Arabi SC player.

Second half Al-Arabi SC entered strongly in the midst of USM Alger retreat to the back and after several attempts Kader Fall reduced the result in the 58th minute, three minutes later Hussain Al-Moussawi managed to adjust the result after a strong shot from outside the penalty area. In the 73rd minute after being alone in front of goalkeeper Mohamed Lamine Zemmamouche, Al-Moussawi missed the opportunity to score the goal. Two minutes later Carolus Andriamatsinoro was fouled inside the penalty area to announce Khalil Jalal a penalty kick for USM Alger, which was successfully executed by captain Mohamed Rabie Meftah. In the 82nd minute Zemmamouche saved his net once again from an accomplished goal, USM Alger bore the burden of the match until the final whistle by winning the title for the first time in its history. To receive the UAFA Club Cup from the hand of Prime Minister Sellal in the presence of the Minister of Youth and Sports and the President of the Algerian Football Federation.

References

External links
UAFA Official website 
UAFA Club Cup 2012/13 - rsssf.com

Arab Club Champions Cup Finals
UAFA
2012–13 in Kuwaiti football
2012–13 in Algerian football